is a Japanese light novel series written by Yui and illustrated by Satsuki Shiina. It was serialized online from September 2015 to January 2022 on the user-generated novel publishing website Shōsetsuka ni Narō. It was later acquired by Ichijinsha, who has released seven volumes since July 2016 under their Iris NEO label.

A manga adaptation with art by Yui Kikuta has been serialized via Ichijinsha's josei manga magazine Monthly Comic Zero Sum since August 2018. It has been collected in seven tankōbon volumes. The light novels and manga are both licensed in North America by J-Novel Club. An anime television series adaptation by Madhouse aired from October to December 2022.

Characters

Known as the "Bibliophile Princess," she belongs to the high nobility with her family being Marquess, (HIDIVE has currently been mistranslating her family as having a lower rank.) Her  family is known for being bibliophiles. She becomes the fiancée of the heir to the throne, but only because of the added perk of gaining access to their library. Elianna’s family alias is “brains of Sauslind”. Members of the Bernstein family have long been considered national treasures due to their ability to read and recall vast amounts of information for the benefit of the kingdom, but at the same time the Bernstein’s have always insisted on remaining politically neutral, so when young Christopher revealed his wish to marry her, Elianna’s grandfather rejected Christopher’s proposal and young Elianna was confined to the Bernstein estate.

Eliana spent her engagement period under the belief it was solely to deflect Christopher's other suitors; not knowing the truth, until one said girl failed to paint Eliana as villainess.

Heir to the throne of the Sauslind Kingdom. Christopher keeps Elianna out of the politics, allowing her access to the royal library and using whatever interesting facts she gleams from the books to help the kingdom; because of such, Eliana remained obvious to his true feelings for years.

Seems to be an administrative counselor of the heir. He always use Elianna like his errand girl, particularly whenever Christopher annoys him. He's called the Ice Lord by Lord Theodore, and the Ice Demon by Lord Glen.

A high ranking knight who seems close to Christopher. 

In charge of the archives, and Christopher’s uncle.

Media

Light novel
Written by Yui and illustrated by Satsuki Shiina, the series was originally serialized online on the Shōsetsuka ni Narō website from September 13, 2015 to January 23, 2022. Ichijinsha acquired the series, and published the first volume in print under their Iris NEO label on July 1, 2016. As of October 2022, seven volumes have been released. The series is licensed in North America by J-Novel Club.

Manga
A manga adaptation with art by Yui Kikuta began serialization in Ichijinsha's Monthly Comic Zero Sum magazine on August 28, 2018. The first tankōbon volume was released on April 25, 2019. As of October 2022, seven volumes have been released. J-Novel Club is also publishing the manga in North America.

Anime
An anime television series adaptation produced by Madhouse was announced on January 28, 2022. The series is directed by Tarō Iwasaki, with scripts written by Mitsutaka Hirota, character designs by Mizuka Takahashi, and music composed by Yūko Fukushima and Tomotaka Ōsumi. It aired from October 6 to December 22, 2022, on AT-X, Tokyo MX, Kansai TV, and BS NTV. Sentai Filmworks licensed the series, and is streaming it on HIDIVE.

Notes

References

External links
  at Shōsetsuka ni Narō 
  
  
  
 

2016 Japanese novels
Anime and manga based on light novels
AT-X (TV network) original programming
Fantasy anime and manga
Ichijinsha manga
J-Novel Club books
Japanese fantasy novels
Josei manga
Light novels
Light novels first published online
Madhouse (company)
Romance anime and manga
Sentai Filmworks
Shōsetsuka ni Narō